The Rundle Building in Glasgow in Valley County, Montana was built in 1916.  It was designed by architects Link and Haire.  It has also been known as Glasgow Hotel.  It was listed on the National Register of Historic Places in 2006.

It is a two-part three-story fireproof brick Western Commercial  building with "colorful detailed terra cotta tile work, raised brick arches, and coped, shaped parapet walls reminiscent of Spanish Mission Revival architecture."  It originally had a billiards room and a bowling alley.

References

National Register of Historic Places in Valley County, Montana
Buildings and structures completed in 1916
Glasgow, Montana
Hotel buildings on the National Register of Historic Places in Montana
Spanish Colonial Revival architecture in the United States
1916 establishments in Montana